Khazen al-Dawlah (19th-century) was a consort of shah Naser al-Din Shah Qajar of Persia (r. 1848–1896).

She was a maid servant of the Shah's mother Malek Jahan Khanom. When the Shah's mother died, he married Gulbadan Khanom so she could take over his mother's task to function as the administrator of the harem and the treasurer of the Shah, and was thus given the new name and title Khazen al-Dawlah.

References

 

19th-century births
19th-century deaths
19th-century Iranian women
Qajar royal consorts